George Lethbridge (9 January 1848 – 26 February 1924) was a British architect known for his war memorial designs.

Family
Lethbridge was born on the 9th January 1848 in Bickleigh, Devon, England. In 1874 he married Jessie Naismith Morton in Edinburgh and they had seven children, the third born was the architect James Morton Lethbridge.  The family, who were Presbyterians, lived in Highgate, at 205 Archway Road.

Career
He served his articles with William Henry Reid of Plymouth and commenced independent practice in London in 1870. Amongst Lethbridge's works were:

The Hornsey Central Hospital (now demolished).

The Hornsey War Memorial, now grade II listed by Historic England,

The Royal Russell School memorial Sundial.

Beauchene, Fitzjohn's Avenue, Hampstead (1880)

Death
George Lethbridge died aged 76, on the 26th February 1924 in Highgate, and is buried in a family grave in Highgate Cemetery, with his wife and five of their children, including his architect son James. The grave is on the eastern side of the cemetery, close to the grave of the novelist George Eliot.

References 

1840s births
1924 deaths
Burials at Highgate Cemetery
19th-century English architects
Year of birth uncertain
Architects from Devon